Khashab may refer to:
 Khashab, Bushehr
 Khashab, Andimeshk, Khuzestan Province
 Khashab, Shadegan, Khuzestan Province

See also
Khoshab (disambiguation)